The Paris Bearcats were a minor league baseball team based in Paris, Texas that played in the East Texas League in 1925 and 1926. The team, which was non affiliated with any major league squads, featured multiple major league players, including Jim Battle, Moose Clabaugh, Jim Oglesby, Jack Russell, Red Schillings and Bill Stellbauer. In 1925, under manager Les Tullos, the squad was the league champion.

References

Baseball teams established in 1925
Defunct minor league baseball teams
1925 establishments in Texas
Paris, Texas
Baseball teams disestablished in 1926
1926 disestablishments in Texas
Defunct baseball teams in Texas
East Texas League teams